Stapleford is a village and former civil parish, now in the parish of Freeby, in the Melton district of Leicestershire, England, east of Melton Mowbray. It is just south of the River Eye. In 1931 the parish had a population of 145. On 1 April 1936 the parish was abolished and merged with Freeby.

The village is the site of the large Stapleford Park. The historic Stapleford Miniature Railway runs in the park. It has a church called St Mary Magdalene's Church.

References 

Villages in Leicestershire
Former civil parishes in Leicestershire
Borough of Melton